{{Taxobox
| name = Coprobacter
| domain = Bacteria
| phylum = Bacteroidota
| classis = Bacteroidia
| ordo = Bacteroidales
| familia = Barnesiellaceae
| genus = Coprobacter
| genus_authority = Shkoporov et al. 2013
| type_species = Coprobacter fastidiosus 
|subdivision_ranks = Species
|subdivision =C. fastidiosusC. secundus  
}}Coprobacter'' is a genus of bacteria from the family of Barnesiellaceae.

References

Further reading 
 
 
 

Bacteroidia
Bacteria genera